The Royal Wiltshire Militia was a militia regiment in Great Britain and the later United Kingdom from 1758 to 1881, when it was amalgamated into The Duke of Edinburgh's (Wiltshire Regiment).

The regiment was organised in late 1758, as the Wiltshire Militia. It was embodied in 1778, at which time it was ranked the 19th regiment of militia, and remained active for five years. It was regularly re-ranked through its embodiment, becoming the 38th in 1779, 22nd in 1780, 37th in 1781, and 9th in 1782.

It was embodied again during the French Revolutionary Wars, ranked as the 35th. With the resumption of hostilities in 1803, it was ranked as the 8th.  In 1833, it was ranked as the 33rd, and in 1841 designated "Royal". It saw service during the Crimean War, being embodied in 1854 and volunteering for garrison service in the Mediterranean.

In 1881, under the Childers Reforms, the regiment was transferred into The Duke of Edinburgh's (Wiltshire Regiment) as the 3rd Battalion. This was embodied during the South African War in 1900, and disembodied in 1902.

During the Haldane Reforms in 1908 the battalion was transferred to the Special Reserve, and was embodied on mobilisation in 1914 for the First World War. As with all Special Reserve battalions, it served as a regimental depot, and was disembodied following the end of hostilities in 1919, with personnel transferred to the 1st Battalion. The battalion nominally remained in existence throughout the Second World War, but was never activated, and was finally disbanded in 1953.

References
Royal Wiltshire Militia, regiments.org

Bibliography

Infantry regiments of the British Army
Military units and formations established in 1758
Military units and formations in Wiltshire
Military units and formations disestablished in 1881
Wiltshire